Astronomical Data Query Language (ADQL) is a language for astronomical data query based on SQL 92.

Overview
ADQL is a specialized variant of the SQL query language adapted for accessing the astronomical datasets of the virtual observatory, via the Table access protocol (TAP).  ADQL is dedigned to handle large datasets distributed over several locations, while not retrieving data that is not needed.

Language
ADQL is a query language that allows data to be retrieved via a single command, the select statement, which is designed to perform as the select statement in the SQL language.  ADQL has extensions designed to improve handling of astronomical data such as spherical co-ordinates that are not handled by standard SQL.

Implementations
ADQL is implemented in packages such as TOPCAT.

References

Footnotes

Sources
 
 
 
 
 
 

Query languages